Tangipahoa is a village in Tangipahoa Parish, Louisiana, United States. The population was 425 at the 2020 census. It was named after the Tangipahoa Native American tribe. Tangipahoa is part of the Hammond Micropolitan Statistical Area.

Etymology
The name Tangipahoa is derived from the Muskogean words (tonche pahoha) which translates to "corncob people" or "people of the corn" or "corncob". It is from this Native American tribe that the modern Tangipahoa Parish gets its name, as well as the Tangipahoa River.

Geography
Tangipahoa is located at  (30.875453, -90.512546).

Demographics

2020 census

As of the 2020 United States census, there were 425 people, 190 households, and 119 families residing in the village.

2000 census
As of the census of 2000, there were 747 people, 235 households, and 171 families residing in the village. The racial makeup of the village was 8.43% White and 91.57% African American. Hispanic or Latino of any race were 0.13% of the population.

There were 235 households, out of which 47.2% had children under the age of 18 living with them, 25.5% were married couples living together, 40.0% had a female householder with no husband present, and 27.2% were non-families. 22.1% of all households were made up of individuals, and 7.2% had someone living alone who was 65 years of age or older. The average household size was 3.18 and the average family size was 3.76.

In the village, the population was spread out, with 41.8% under the age of 18, 11.2% from 18 to 24, 23.2% from 25 to 44, 15.7% from 45 to 64, and 8.2% who were 65 years of age or older. The median age was 22 years. For every 100 females, there were 79.6 males. For every 100 females age 18 and over, there were 71.9 males.

The median income for a household in the village was $13,438, and the median income for a family was $14,226. Males had a median income of $21,875 versus $12,500 for females. The per capita income for the village was $6,775. About 45.7% of families and 50.1% of the population were below the poverty line, including 62.7% of those under age 18 and 41.8% of those age 65 or over.

Notable person
Michael Jackson, NFL player and mayor from 2009 through 2012.

See also
Camp Moore

References

1853 establishments in Louisiana
Populated places established in the 1850s
Villages in Louisiana
Villages in Tangipahoa Parish, Louisiana